Marwān ibn ʿAbd al-Malik ibn Marwān (d. 715/16 or 716/17), referred to as Marwān al-Akbar to distinguish him from his younger half-brother with the same name, was an Umayyad prince, son of Caliph Abd al-Malik ibn Marwan, and one-time heir to the caliphate.

Life
Marwan was a son of the Umayyad caliph Abd al-Malik ibn Marwan and his first wife Wallada bint al-Abbas ibn al-Jaz, a member of the Banu Abs tribe and fourth-generation descendant of Zuhayr ibn Jadhima. Marwan was a full brother of the caliphs al-Walid I and Sulayman. According to the 10th-century historian al-Tabari, Abd al-Malik instructed his immediate chosen successors al-Walid and Sulayman to invest the succession after them to their half-brother Yazid II (son of Atika bint Yazid) and then to Marwan al-Akbar. According to al-Baladhuri, however, it was to be passed to Marwan al-Asghar (another son of Atika). Marwan al-Akbar died on his return to Syria from the Hajj in Mecca in 715/16 or 716/17. He left no children. After his death, Caliph Sulayman maneuvered to remove Yazid II from the succession and install his own son Ayyub, but the latter predeceased Sulayman.

References

Bibliography

710s deaths
8th-century Arabs
Sons of Umayyad caliphs
Non-inheriting heirs presumptive